Frankton is a central suburb of the city of Hamilton, New Zealand. It is the site of the city's passenger railway station, a major industrial-commercial stretch of State Highway 1, and a commercial shopping area. Frankton Borough Council was formed in 1913, but merged with Hamilton in 1917, after a poll in 1916.

Demographics

Frankton had a population of 6,504 at the 2018 New Zealand census, an increase of 1,335 people (25.8%) since the 2013 census, and an increase of 1,716 people (35.8%) since the 2006 census. There were 2,319 households, comprising 3,207 males and 3,312 females, giving a sex ratio of 0.97 males per female, with 1,473 people (22.6%) aged under 15 years, 1,902 (29.2%) aged 15 to 29, 2,628 (40.4%) aged 30 to 64, and 507 (7.8%) aged 65 or older.

Ethnicities were 54.1% European/Pākehā, 35.7% Māori, 9.9% Pacific peoples, 17.7% Asian, and 3.0% other ethnicities. People may identify with more than one ethnicity.

The percentage of people born overseas was 23.8, compared with 27.1% nationally.

Although some people chose not to answer the census's question about religious affiliation, 47.3% had no religion, 33.3% were Christian, 2.0% had Māori religious beliefs, 4.4% were Hindu, 1.8% were Muslim, 1.2% were Buddhist and 3.6% had other religions.

Of those at least 15 years old, 942 (18.7%) people had a bachelor's or higher degree, and 951 (18.9%) people had no formal qualifications. 366 people (7.3%) earned over $70,000 compared to 17.2% nationally. The employment status of those at least 15 was that 2,598 (51.6%) people were employed full-time, 549 (10.9%) were part-time, and 408 (8.1%) were unemployed.

Railway

Frankton is the location of Hamilton's only passenger railway station. The station is sited at the junction of the North Island Main Trunk line (NIMT) and the East Coast Main Trunk line, but passenger services on the East Coast line were discontinued and only the Northern Explorer passenger train stops six days a week on its journey between Auckland and Wellington on the NIMT. The station was formerly called Frankton Junction, a very important railway station, and included the now-closed Frankton Tea Rooms, where passenger trains without dining cars would stop to allow passengers to purchase food and drinks. Many workshops and railway workers homes were in the area west of the railway.

Commerce Street
The main street of Frankton, Commerce Street, and the streets surrounding it, form one of Hamilton City's largest suburban non-mall shopping areas. The area is dominated by the well-known, locally owned department store, Forlongs Furnishings of Frankton, established in 1946. In 2015 it closed, but reopened in 2016 in part of the store, as a furniture shop in Rawhiti Street and further expanded back into part of its Commerce Street store in 2018.

Hotels 
Four hotels once stood near the railway station. Two were to the west in Colombo Street and two on the other side of the line on High St.

Frankton Hotel 
Frankton Hotel remains on the corner of Commerce and High Streets. It was built in 1929 as a 35-room hotel to a design by Jack Chitty and is listed as a category 2 historic place. During the move, the bar was in a temporary shed.

Empire Hotel 
The New Empire Hotel was on the corner of Empire and High Streets. It was renovated in 1974, the original Empire Hotel having been built in February 1913. In 1995 it was burnt down by an arsonist, killing six residents. In 1946 the Grand Hotel on Colombo St had also burnt down.

Industry 
Frankton has long been one of Hamilton's industrial centres. In addition to the Railway House Factory, another major employer was a factory on a  site, beside the railway, on the corner of Massey and Lincoln streets, specializing in brawn, sausages and polonies from 1901 to 2014. Pigs were slaughtered there from 1911 to 1999. It had a railway siding from 1912 until the 1990s. The factory had several owners, including Waikato Farmers' Bacon Co, W.Dimock & Co Ltd and J.C.Hutton Australia from 1926 to 1986. Hutton's then merged with Kiwi Bacon Co to become Hutton's Kiwi. In 2007 Goodman Fielder were warned for misleading labels, as some of its pork was imported. In 2014 they sold their meat brands to Hellers and 125 staff lost their jobs.

Frankton had dairy factories from 1894 and still has a cool store in the former dairy and bacon factories.

V8 Supercars
The New Zealand leg of the Australian V8 Supercars centred on Hamilton Street Circuit in and around Frankton, yearly from April 2008 to 2012.

Tornado 

Three people were killed, seven victims were badly injured and damage to property was heavy after a tornado swept across Hamilton from the north-west shortly before midday on Wednesday 25 August 1948.

The tornado, which appears to have originated in the Frankton or Forest Lake area, went through the business area of Frankton then over the hill into Hamilton West where it passed between Hamilton Lake and Victoria Street (the main street). Then, it travelled across the Waikato River to Hamilton East where damage occurred in Wellington, Naylor and Grey streets.

Buildings were lifted off their piles, chimneys were snapped off, houses were unroofed, trees uprooted, and power and telephone lines were left hanging in the streets. The air was filled with flying corrugated iron, branches of trees, timber and other debris. Heavy rain accompanied the storm and overhead lightning flashed and thunder boomed. The storm passed quickly and was succeeded by a strange calm.

Education
Rhode Street School is a full primary school for years 1 to 8 with a roll of  students. It was established in 1959.

Frankton School is a contributing primary school for years 1 to 6 with a roll of  students. Frankton School opened in 1911

Both schools are coeducational. Rolls are as of

See also

List of streets in Hamilton
Suburbs of Hamilton, New Zealand
Photo of Frankton Junction Station, early 1890s
St Columbas Catholic School, Hamilton, New Zealand

References

External links 
 View of interior of housing factory 1923

Populated places in Waikato
Suburbs of Hamilton, New Zealand